The first USS Duncan (DD-46) was a  in the United States Navy during World War I. She was named for Commander Silas Duncan.

Duncan was launched on 5 April 1913 by Fore River Shipbuilding Company, Quincy, Massachusetts; sponsored by Miss D. Clark; and commissioned on 30 August 1913, Lieutenant Commander C. E. Courtney in command.

World War I
Duncan sailed along the East Coast and in the Caribbean for training, target practice, and exercises until 24 October 1914, when she was placed out of commission at Boston, Massachusetts. Recommissioned on 22 January 1916, she sailed out of Hampton Roads and Newport, Rhode Island for Neutrality Patrol and exercises in the Caribbean, protecting battleships in fleet maneuvers, and guarding the entrance to the York River. From 8–30 September 1917, she escorted a convoy to an eastern rendezvous, where an escort out of England met the ships.

Sailing for New York on 30 October, Duncan escorted a convoy to Brest, France, arriving at Queenstown, Ireland, on 15 November to escort convoys and hunt submarines in the Irish Sea.

Inter-war period
Remaining in European waters after the war, Duncan joined in escorting , bearing President Woodrow Wilson, into Brest on 13 December. She cleared Queenstown on 26 December for the Azores, Bermuda, and Norfolk, Virginia, arriving on 12 January 1919.

After five months of East Coast and Caribbean operations, she was placed in ordinary at Norfolk on 31 May; in reduced commission on 1 January 1920; in reserve on 1 August; assigned to operate with 50% of her complement on 1 January 1921; and decommissioned on 9 August. She was scrapped on 8 March 1935 in accordance with the terms of the London Naval Treaty.

References

External links

Cassin-class destroyers
World War I destroyers of the United States
Ships built in Quincy, Massachusetts
1913 ships